The Big Store is a 1941 American comedy film starring the Marx Brothers (Groucho Marx, Harpo Marx and Chico Marx) that takes place in a large department store. Groucho appears as private detective Wolf J. Flywheel (a character name originating from the Marx-Perrin radio show Flywheel, Shyster, and Flywheel in the early 1930s).

The Big Store was the last of the five films that the Marx Bros. made under contract to Metro-Goldwyn-Mayer. The Marxes had decided to retire as a team and The Big Store was advertised as their farewell film. However, they would return to the screen in A Night in Casablanca (1946) and Love Happy (1949).

The film also features singer Tony Martin and Virginia Grey as the love interests and longtime Marx Brothers foil Margaret Dumont in her seventh and final film with the Marxes. The villain is portrayed by Douglass Dumbrille, who had played a similar role in A Day at the Races (1937).

Plot
Department-store owner Hiram Phelps has died, leaving half-ownership in the store to his nephew, singer Tommy Rogers. The other half is owned by Hiram's sister and Tommy's aunt Martha Phelps. Rogers has no interest in running a department store, so he plans to sell his interest in the store and use the money to build a music conservatory. Mr. Grover, the store manager, plots to kill Rogers before he can sell his half of the business, marry the wealthy Martha and then likely kill her, becoming sole owner of the store. Martha is suspicious, worried about Tommy's safety if anyone should suspect her of engaging in foul play to take over the store. Against Grover's wishes, she hires private detective Wolf J. Flywheel as a floorwalker and Tommy's bodyguard. Tommy is in love with store employee Joan Sutton and Flywheel romances Martha. Flywheel, Ravelli and Wacky eventually expose Grover and save Tommy.

Cast

Production
The film has two extended scenes with all three Marx Brothers. One is in the store's bed department, with beds that come out of the walls and floor. The other takes place near the film's climax, when Groucho, Chico and Harpo escape their pursuers in a madcap chase through the store, involving the elevator, a staircase, chandeliers, roller skates, a mail chute and a bicycle. This elaborate sequence took an entire month to shoot and utilized an unusual number of stunt doubles, Mack Sennett-type slapstick stunts and stop-motion photography for a Marx Brothers film.

At two points, Groucho breaks the fourth wall. During the "Sing While You Sell" sequence, as he narrates a fashion show, he speaks a few asides, including "This is a bright red dress, but Technicolor is so expensive." Later, after Grover has been exposed as the villain, Groucho comments, "I told you in the first reel he was a crook."

Music
As with the previous Marx Bros. MGM films, The Big Store contains elaborate musical numbers, including the upbeat "Sing While You Sell" led by a singing and dancing Groucho, "Tenement Symphony" sung by Tony Martin and a children's choir. The screenwriting team of Sid Kuller, Ray Golden and Hal Fimberg also supplied the lyrics to Hal Borne's original music. An instrumental version of the Arthur Freed/Nacio Herb Brown tune "Sing Before Breakfast" from Broadway Melody of 1936 is heard during the Groucho-Harpo scene. The Big Store is the second Marx film with an instrumental version of "Cosi-Cosa" from A Night at the Opera, which can be heard during the bed department scene. It is also heard at the beginning of the racetrack scene in A Day at the Races.

 "If It's You": Tony Martin (music and lyrics by Ben Oakland, Artie Shaw and Milton Drake)
 "Sing While You Sell": Groucho, Six Hits and a Miss, Virginia O'Brien and Harpo as a drum-beating snake charmer
 "Rock-a-bye Baby": Virginia O'Brien
 "Mama Eu Quero": Chico and Harpo (piano duet)
 "A Whimsical Trio": Harpo (harp, violin, cello) (by Mario Castelnuovo-Tedesco, using music from a Mozart sonata and a Beethoven minuet)
 "Tenement Symphony": Tony Martin, onstage choir and orchestra, featuring Chico and Harpo

Reception
Reviews for The Big Store were generally positive, but unenthusiastic.

Theodore Strauss of The New York Times wrote that "if it lacks the continuously harebrained invention of, say, 'A Night at the Opera,' the boys are still the most erratic maniacs this side of bars. If one were entirely truthful one would have to admit that the picture has many a dull stretch, that the tricks have been overworked, that the boys are slowing down, etc., etc. But with Marxian adherents—among whom we most decidedly belong—the question is simply, Are the Marx Brothers in it? They are."

A review in Variety called the film a "moderate comedy where dull stretches overshadow the several socko laugh sequences during a bumpy unfolding ... Marx Bros. repeat their familiar antics without much variation from previous appearances."

Film Daily suggested that a couple of the chase scenes were "a little lengthy" but still concluded, "A 'laugh clocker' could run a high total checking this and the preview audience seemed to love it."

John Mosher of The New Yorker wrote that the film was "not great Marx material, not a film that collectors will exhibit as a sample of this era's humor, but again and again the old flash is there."

The Big Store returned a modest profit of $33,000, but it was initially the most profitable of the three final Marx Brothers films for MGM.

References

External links

 
 
 
 
 The Marx Brothers Council Podcast episode discussing "The Big Store"

1941 films
1941 comedy films
American black-and-white films
1940s English-language films
Marx Brothers (film series)
Films set in department stores
Metro-Goldwyn-Mayer films
Films directed by Charles Reisner
1940s American films